Crestview High School is a public high school in Weller Township, just west of Ashland, Ohio, United States. It is the only high school in the Crestview Local School District. The high school enrolled 416 students as of the 2006-2007 academic year.

Crestview Local School District was created in 1962 as the result of a merging of Union School in Epworth and Savannah School in Savannah.  The school serves a largely rural population of students from both Ashland and Richland Counties.

Crestview's school mascot is the cougar and the official colors are red and white, though black is commonly worn on uniforms. Red and black had been the official colors of Union High School, while green and white had been the official colors of the Savannah Sailors.

Athletics
Students at Crestview High School can participate in sports such as: baseball, basketball, cheerleading, football, golf, soccer, swimming and diving, volleyball, wrestling, track, and cross country running. School clubs include: Spanish Club, Fellowship of Christian Athletes, Academic Challenge, Art Club, Gamer’s Club, Odyssey of the Mind, and the Red Glasses  among others.

The Cougars are members of the Firelands Conference, and in August 2014 became affiliates of the Mid-Buckeye Conference for girls soccer. They have one state championship which was accomplished by the golf team in 2012. Josh Brooks, Bryce Lutz, Ben Olewiler, Michael Staniford, and Joe Frazier all competed at North Star Golf Club in Sunbury, Ohio to win the two-day tournament for the school's first Ohio State championship.

References

External links
 

High schools in Richland County, Ohio
Public high schools in Ohio